Greece competed at the 1984 Summer Paralympics in Stoke Mandeville, Great Britain and New York City, United States. 3 competitors from Greece won no medals and so did not place in the medal table.

See also 
 Greece at the Paralympics
 Greece at the 1984 Summer Olympics

References 

1984
1984 in Greek sport
Nations at the 1984 Summer Paralympics